The local government of the City of Pula is seated in the Communal Palace, located on the Forum Square, in the center of the city.

History 

The Communal Palace is situated at the northern end of the main square of the old part of the City of Pula, called the Forum Square. The spot occupied by the Palace has been used for the public buildings since Ancient Rome, when the place was used as a part of a triad of Roman temples, of which today only the Temple of Augustus remains. The eastern of these temples, called the Temple of Diana, was used as a rudimentary city hall from the 9th century.

As the city prospered, there was a need to construct a dedicated place which would serve as a city hall, so the construction of the new city hall at the site of the Temple of Diana began near the end of the 13th century, and the new city hall was finished in 1296.

The building was constructed in Gothic style using the material of the old Roman temples and other building on the site, retaining their walls when possible. Even today, the whole northern part of the Temple of Diana is clearly visible at the back side of the Communal Palace.

Since the construction, the Communal Palace has seen numerous reconstructions. At the end of the 15th century the building was reconstructed in Renaissance style and during the 17th century, the building was again reconstructed, now in Baroque style.

The present state of building is due to several reconstructions made during the 19th and 20th centuries, the last of which was finished in 1988.

References 

 Istrian Encyclopaedia, Leksikografski zavod Miroslav Krleža, 2005, 
 The official web page of the City of Pula about the Communal palace

External links 
 
 The site about Communal Palace (in English) 

Buildings and structures completed in 1296
Communal Palace
City and town halls in Croatia
Tourist attractions in Pula